The 2007–08 UCLA Bruins men's basketball team represented the University of California, Los Angeles in the Pacific-10 Conference for the 2007–08 NCAA Division I men's basketball season.  In his fifth year as head coach, Ben Howland led the team to its third straight Final Four appearance.  The Bruins also set a new record number of wins for the regular season, eclipsing the 26 wins of 2006–07.  Though the team was composed of many standout players, freshman center Kevin Love garnered much of the media's and school's attention with his .565 shooting percentage, 10.7 rebounds per game, 5.3 blocks, and 17.6 points per game.

The only losses the Bruins incurred during the regular season were to No. 8 Texas, and Pac-10 rivals USC and Washington, though the USC victory was later vacated upon discovery that USC player O. J. Mayo received illegal benefits while playing for USC.  After becoming the Pacific-10 regular season champions and winning the Pacific-10 tournament, the Bruins were seeded No. 1 in the West Regional bracket of the 2008 NCAA Division I men's basketball tournament.  In the first round of the NCAA tournament, the Bruins held Mississippi Valley State to 29 points, the lowest total ever allowed in the first or second round of the tournament. After reaching the Final Four for the third year in a row, the Bruins lost to Memphis, the South Regional Champions. On August 20, 2009, Memphis' 38 wins during the 2007–2008 season and Final Four appearances were vacated by the NCAA Committee on Infractions for the team's using an ineligible player, Derrick Rose.

Recruiting class

Roster

Thirteen scholarships were available to the team, and there were sixteen players on the roster. Kevin Love received permission from Walt Hazzard to wear the No. 42 he wore as player for UCLA.  Hazzard's jersey had been retired by UCLA in 1996.

Schedule

|-
!colspan=9 style=|Non-Conference Season

|-
!colspan=9 style=|Non-Conference Season

|-
!colspan=9 style=|Conference Season

|-
!colspan=12 style="background:#;"| Pac-10 Tournament

|-
!colspan=12 style="background:#;"| NCAA tournament

Source:

Notes

Awards

Pac-10 Player of the Year
Kevin Love
Pac-10 Freshman of the Year
Kevin Love
Pac-10 Defensive Player of the Year
Russell Westbrook
All-Pac-10 first team
Kevin Love
All-Pac-10 second team
Darren Collison
All-Pac-10 third team
Russell Westbrook
Pac-10 All-Defensive team
Darren Collison
Russell Westbrook
Kevin Love (honorable mention)
Luc Richard Mbah a Moute (honorable mention)
Pac-10 Tournament Most Outstanding Player
Darren Collison
Pac-10 All-Tournament Team
Kevin Love
Russell Westbrook
U.S. Basketball Writers Association First Team All-America
Kevin Love
Oscar Robertson Trophy nominee
Kevin Love
U.S. Basketball Writers Association District IX Player of the Year
Kevin Love
U.S. Basketball Writers Association All-District IX team
Kevin Love
Darren Collison
Pac-10 Men's Basketball Player of the Week
Kevin Love – November 19–25
Kevin Love – January 7–13
Kevin Love – January 21–27
Darren Collison – February 12–18

See also
 2008 NCAA Division I men's basketball tournament
 2008 Pacific-10 Conference men's basketball tournament
 2007-08 NCAA Division I men's basketball season
 2007-08 NCAA Division I men's basketball rankings

Notes
 The Bruins had the most ever wins for a final record (including postseason tournaments) as well, with 35.
 Seven of the Bruins wins were vs. ranked teams (AP Top-25) at the time they played: (#11 Michigan State, #20 Stanford, #4 Washington State, #17 Washington State, #7 Stanford, #11 Stanford and #12 Xavier)

References

UCLA Bruins men's basketball seasons
UCLA Bruins
NCAA Division I men's basketball tournament Final Four seasons
Pac-12 Conference men's basketball tournament championship seasons
UCLA
NCAA
NCAA